The Alliance of the Hearts of Jesus and Mary refers to the historical, theological and spiritual links in Catholic devotions to the Sacred Heart of Jesus and the Immaculate Heart of Mary.

The joint devotion to the hearts was first formalized in the 17th century by Jean Eudes who organized the scriptural, theological and liturgical sources relating to the devotions and obtained the approbation of the Catholic Church, shortly before the purported visions of Marguerite Marie Alacoque. He wrote the Mass and Office proper to the feasts, composed various prayers and rosaries and wrote the first book on the topic. In the 18th and 19th centuries, northern and central France became fertile ground for the growth of devotions to the hearts of Jesus and Mary, both jointly and individually. Catherine Labouré's Miraculous Medal depicts the Heart of Jesus thorn-crowned and the Heart of Mary pierced with a sword.

The devotions, and the associated prayers, continued into the 20th century, e.g. in prayers by Maximillian Kolbe which built on the Montfortean theme of "to Jesus through Mary" and the reported messages of Our Lady of Fátima which stated that the Heart of Jesus wishes to be honored together with the Heart of Mary.

Various popes have supported the individual and joint devotions to the hearts through the centuries. In the 1956 encyclical Haurietis aquas, Pope Pius XII encouraged the joint devotion to the hearts. In the 1979 encyclical Redemptor hominis Pope John Paul II explained the theme of unity of Mary's Immaculate Heart with the Sacred Heart. In his Angelus address on September 15, 1985 Pope John Paul II coined the term The Alliance of the Hearts of Jesus and Mary, and in 1986 addressed the international conference on that topic held at Fátima, Portugal.

History

The Hearts of Jesus and Mary are mentioned explicitly only briefly in the New Testament. Luke 2:19 states: "Mary kept all these things pondering them in her heart", and Luke 2:51: "His mother kept all these things carefully in her heart". Matthew 11:25 refers to the heart of Jesus: "Learn from me for I am meek and humble of heart." 

Devotion to the Sacred Heart of Jesus on its own dates back to the 11th century and was addressed by Bernard of Clairvaux and Gertrude the Great in the 12th and 13th centuries. Bonaventure referred to the Heart of Jesus and the Heart of Mary throughout his writings during the 13th century, but the most poignant passage is in the devotional work The Mystical Vine, a description of the Passion of Christ.

The joint devotion to the Hearts of Jesus and Mary formally started in the 17th century. Jean Eudes (1601–1680) established the Society of the Heart of the Mother Most Admirable, which resembled the Third Order of Saint Francis and dedicated the seminary chapels of Caen and Coutances to the Sacred Hearts. Although Eudes always associated the two Sacred Hearts, he began his devotional teachings with the Heart of Mary, and then extended it to the Sacred Heart of Jesus. Eudes was partly influenced by the writings of Francis de Sales on the perfections of the Heart of Mary as the model of love for God.

Eudes organized the scriptural, theological and liturgical sources relating to the Sacred Hearts of Jesus and Mary and promoted them with the approbation of the Catholic Church.
The feast of the Holy Heart of Mary was celebrated for the first time in 1648, and that of the Sacred Heart of Jesus in 1670. The Mass and Office proper to these feasts were composed by Eudes in 1668, briefly preceding Marguerite Marie Alacoque in establishing the devotion to the Sacred Hearts. He composed various prayers and rosaries to the Sacred Hearts. His book "Le Cœur Admirable de la Très Sainte Mère de Dieu" ("The Admirable Heart of the Most Holy Mother of God") is the first book ever written on the devotion to the Sacred Hearts.

In December 1673 Alacoque reported a vision of Christ in which Jesus showed her the Sacred Heart. After her death in 1690, the devotion was promoted by the Jesuits. Devotion to the two Hearts continued to spread in France. On Christmas Eve in 1800, amid the French Revolution, knowing they could face the guillotine for their actions, Peter Coudrin and Henriette Aymer de Chevalerie established the Congregation of the Sacred Hearts of Jesus and Mary with a mission to spread the message of God's love manifested through the Hearts of Jesus and Mary and through the adoration of the Blessed Sacrament. Future members of the congregation included Damien de Veuster of Molokai. By the beginning of the 19th century the devotion to the Immaculate Heart was sufficiently widespread in Europe for Pope Pius VII to allow a feast to honor it in 1805.

Since the 19th century there has been a steady increase in Roman Catholic devotion to the Heart of Mary, and devotional images of the Virgin Mary pointing to her sinlessly glowing heart have become widespread. Many images of the Immaculate Heart of Mary still show it as pierced or wounded and, in some cases, as bleeding. Other orders and devotions continued thereafter; for example, the Order of the Sisters of the Sacred Hearts of Jesus and Mary was founded in 1866 by Victor Braun.

Pope Pius XII consecrated the human race to the Immaculate Heart on December 8, 1942. In 1944 he extended the feast to the Catholic Church and set its date of celebration on August 22. Because August 22 is now the feast of the Queenship of Mary, the feast of the Immaculate Heart is celebrated the day after that of the Sacred Heart.

In 1985, Pope John Paul II remarked on "the admirable alliance of the Hearts of Jesus and Mary". Several symposiums were subsequently held on the concept. "Some Mariologists saw the alliance as a renewal of the older forms of devotion to the Sacred Heart and the Immaculate Heart ... However, other Mariologists dismissed the entire concept of the Two Hearts as mere 'devotionalism', having no real value for scientific Marian theology because of its association with private revelation. The latter position prevails in the apparatus of academic theology while the former position continues to have influence outside of it."

Joint devotions and prayers

Devotions to the Sacred Heart of Jesus and to the Immaculate Heart of Mary are linked in historical, theological and spiritual ways. Terms such as the Holy Heart, Agonizing Heart and Compassionate Heart have also been used in devotions.

The object of the devotion to the Heart of Mary is her physical heart that burned so intensely with love for God. Because of the inherently close relationship of Mary and Jesus in the Catholic teachings on salvation, the Heart of Mary is associated with the Heart of Jesus. The Sacred Heart is viewed as the source of God's boundless love and charity, while the devotion to the Immaculate Heart stresses the nature of Mary's love and concern for all who call upon her.

The two Hearts are linked by devotions, prayers and feasts. The Catholic Feast of the Immaculate Heart, which is always assigned to a Saturday, is celebrated the day after the Solemnity of the Sacred Heart which always falls on a Friday, 19 days after Pentecost. Catholic devotional guides encourage the faithful to honor them together in celebration of God's generous love.

The link and the relationship between the Hearts of Jesus and Mary is also manifested in various Catholic prayers. The conclusion to the private devotion, theLitany of the Sacred Heart of Mary is an example:
O most merciful God, Who, for the salvation of sinners and the refuge of the miserable, wast pleased that the Immaculate Heart of the Blessed Virgin Mary should be most like in charity and pity to the Divine Heart of Thy Son Jesus Christ; grant that we, who commemorate this most sweet and loving Heart, may by the merits and intercession of the same Blessed Virgin merit to be found according to the Heart of Jesus. Through the same Christ our Lord. Amen.

Prayers to the Agonizing Heart of Jesus also relate it to the Heart of Mary:

 Agonizing Heart of Jesus, Beloved of the Father, Living Temple of the Holy Spirit, delight of the Immaculate Heart of Mary - I adore Thee and I love Thee, have pity on the dying.

 Mary conceived without sin, pray for us, who trust in Thee. Praised be the Agonizing Heart of Jesus! Praised be the Compassionate Heart of Mary!

A third devotional element often associated with the Hearts of Jesus and Mary is the Body and Blood of Christ represented in the Eucharist. The view of the sacraments as gifts to the church positions the Hearts as the primary channel of Christ's boundless love and Mary's endless compassion. 

The Morning offering specifically refers to the Immaculate Heart of Mary in offering reparation for sins to the Sacred Heart of Jesus:

O Jesus through the Immaculate Heart of Mary,
I offer You my prayers, works, joys, sufferings of this day,
in union with the Holy Sacrifice of the Mass throughout the world.
I offer them for all the intentions of Your Sacred Heart:
the salvation of souls, the reparation for sin, the reunion of Christians;
and in particular for the intentions of the Holy Father this month.
Amen.

Saints and the Blessed
Since the 17th century, the devotions to the Hearts of Jesus and Mary, individually and jointly, have been promoted and encouraged by a number of saints and the blessed. While Jean Eudes was the main force in formalizing and promoting the joint devotion to the Hearts of Jesus and Mary, the efforts of other saints prepared the environment in which the devotion could flourish. Pope Leo XIII gave Eudes the title of "Author of the Liturgical Worship of the Sacred Heart of Jesus and Holy Heart of Mary" and both Pope Leo XIII and Pope Pius X called him  the "father, teacher and first apostle" of devotions to the Hearts of Jesus and Mary.

In the 18th and 19th centuries, northern and central France became fertile ground for the growth of devotions to the Hearts of Jesus and Mary. Louis Grignion de Montfort was a fervent preacher. In 1830 in Paris, Catherine Labouré reported a vision in which she saw the Sacred Heart of Jesus and Immaculate Heart of Mary, the Heart of Jesus thorn-crowned and the Heart of Mary pierced with a sword.

The devotions, and the associated prayers, continued into the 20th century. The Immaculata prayer by Maximillian Kolbe builds on the Montfortean theme of "Jesus through Mary". It ends as follows: "For wherever You enter You obtain the grace of conversion and growth in holiness, since it is through Your hands that all graces come to us from the most Sacred Heart of Jesus. Allow me to praise You, O Sacred Virgin, Give me strength against Your enemies. Amen."

The three children who reported the messages of Our Lady of Fátima emphasized the links between the two Hearts and stated that the Heart of Jesus wishes to be honored together with the Heart of Mary. In 1920, shortly before her death at age 9, Jacinta Marto, one of the three children of the Our Lady of Fátima apparitions reportedly discussed the Hearts of Jesus and Mary with her 12-year-old cousin Lúcia dos Santos, another one of the three children, and said:

When you are to say this, don't go and hide. Tell everybody that God grants us graces through the Immaculate Heart of Mary; that people are to ask Her for them; and that the Heart of Jesus wants the Immaculate Heart of Mary to be venerated at His side. Tell them also to pray to the Immaculate Heart of Mary for peace, since God entrusted it to Her.

Lúcia dos Santos later became a nun called Sister Lúcia of Jesus and of the Immaculate Heart.

Popes

Throughout the centuries, the Catholic Church and several popes have supported the individual devotions to the Hearts of Jesus and Mary, as well as the joint devotion. Even before the beginning of private revelations of the Sacred Hearts of Jesus and Mary, John Eudes had obtained from the ecclesiastical authorities permission to celebrate the Feast of the Heart of Mary in 1648.

In 1765, devotion to the Sacred Heart of Jesus was formally approved. In 1799 Pope Pius VI permitted a Feast of the Heart of Mary in Palermo, Sicily and in 1805 Pope Pius VII extended it throughout the world. In 1855, an Office and Mass in honor of the Most Pure Heart of Mary was permitted for the Catholic Church. Pope Pius IX extended the Feast of the Sacred Heart of Jesus to the entire Catholic Church in 1858.

Pope Pius XII instituted the Feast of the Immaculate Heart of Mary for the Catholic Church in 1945. In the 1956 encyclical Haurietis aquas, he stated: "In order that favors in great abundance may flow on all Christians, nay, on the whole human race, from the devotion to the most Sacred Heart of Jesus, let the faithful see to it that to this devotion the Immaculate Heart of the Mother of God is closely joined."

In the 1979 encyclical Redemptor hominis (item 22), Pope John Paul II explained the theme of unity of Mary's Immaculate Heart with the Sacred Heart.: "We can say that the mystery of the Redemption took shape beneath the heart of the Virgin of Nazareth when she pronounced her "fiat". From then on, under the special influence of the Holy Spirit, this heart, the heart of both a virgin and a mother, has always followed the work of her Son and has gone out to all those whom Christ has embraced and continues to embrace with inexhaustible love." 

Pope John Paul II stated that: "devotion to the Sacred Heart of Jesus and to the Immaculate Heart of Mary has been an important part of the sensus fidei of the People of God". In his Angelus address on September 15, 1985, Pope John Paul II coined the term The Alliance of the Hearts of Jesus and Mary, and in 1986 addressed the international conference on that topic held at Fátima, Portugal. He often invoked the Sacred and Immaculate Hearts together and at the beginning of the 21st century encouraged all nations to "consecrate themselves to the Sacred Heart of Jesus and the Immaculate Heart of Mary".

See also

 Consecration and entrustment to Mary

References

Further reading
 The Theology of the Alliance of the Two Hearts: Documents of the 1997 International Theological Pastoral Symposium on the Alliance of the Hearts of Jesus and Mary, edited by Édouard Gagnon, René Laurentin Published by Two Hearts Media Org., 1997 
 The Alliance of the Hearts of Jesus and Mary: Hope for the World by Michael O'Carroll, 2007, Queenship Publishing

External links
 Pierced Hearts

Catholic devotions
Catholic theology and doctrine
Marian devotions
Catholic Mariology